Divizia Națională de Seniori is the second level of Romanian league competition for rugby union clubs. Divizia Națională de Seniori is run by Federația Română de Rugby. The top three teams of each group will play promotion playoffs and the remaining three teams play relegation playoffs.

Competition

Format
The format is similar to that of the 2018–19 SuperLiga season. The Divizia Națională de Seniori season takes place between September and May. There are two groups of 6 teams in each one, with every team in division 1 playing each other home and away for a total of 8 matches per team and every team in division 2 to play each other home and away for a total of 6 matches per team. Points are awarded according to the following:
4 points for a win
2 points for a draw
1 bonus point is awarded to a team scoring 4 tries or more in a match
1 bonus point is awarded to a team that loses a match by 7 points or fewer

Promotion and relegation
The regular season runs through 8 and 6 matchdays. Upon completion of the regular season, the top three teams of each division qualify for the promotion playoff and the rest of the teams go to the relegation play-offs.

Finals
After the promotion playoff, final stages are played to determine the winner of the Divizia Națională de Seniori. The pairing of the final stages are as follows:

2018-19 season teams

Group Centre-North

Group Centre-South

See also
 Rugby union in Romania

External links
 Federaţia Romănă de Rugby
 SuperLiga CEC Bank
 Romanian Rugby

Rugby union leagues in Romania